Theatre Arts and Performance is a professionally oriented acting training program offered within the School of Communications, Media, Arts and Design at Centennial College, in Toronto, Ontario, Canada.

Campus and Studio Spaces 
The primary campus is the Story Arts Centre.  Text-based and seminar classes are held in classrooms on this campus, as are guest appearances and school meetings.  Studio work, including acting, voice and movement classes were originally to be held at the Toronto Centre for the Arts.  In the summer of 2017, the program moved into its new home at Daniels Spectrum studios in Regent Park.

Program 
Theatre Arts and Performance is a 6 semester program, typically taken over three years.

Intake 
Students normally apply through the Ontario College Application Service.

References 

Drama schools in Canada
Drama schools